Charlie Chamberlain (14 July 1911 in Bathurst, New Brunswick, Canada – 16 July 1972) was a featured entertainer on Don Messer's Jubilee, which ran from 1957 through 1969 on CBC Television.

He died in Bathurst, New Brunswick, the town where he was born, only two days after his 61st birthday. At the time, he had been appearing with Don Messer on independent TV station CHCH-TV in Hamilton, Ontario, who picked up the show for some four years after it was cancelled by the CBC in 1969.

Life 
Chamberlain's mother was widowed early and to assist her around the home, he went to work in the lumber woods at the age of eight. In this setting was an extroverted young person who was eager to entertain. During WWI, he allegedly sang to the soldiers on passing trains. While riding a train himself, a friend of Don Messer's heard Charlie singing, and put him in touch with the fiddler who was looking for a vocalist. Charlie Chamberlain performed pretty much exclusively with Messer for the rest of his career.

Chamberlain is most often recalled as an incredible character, a huge man with huge appetites, who was notoriously generous, and quite freely shared his money with friends and neighbours. During the sixties, when Don Messer's Jubilee was one of the highest rated TV shows in Canada, Charlie also worked pumping gas at a service station in Lakeside, NS.

Career 
Chamberlain was known as Messer's "Singing Lumberjack," and his vocal work is featured on many of the albums released by Don Messer and His Islanders. Chamberlain is remembered as a showstopper, famed for his signature bowler hat and shillelagh.

Discography

Solo Records 

 Charlie Chamberlain Sings Irish Songs, Apex,  AL1619
 With My Shillelagh Under My Arm (LP), Point Records, P-319

Collaborations with Marg Osburne 

 By Request Favorite Sacred Songs with Marg Osburne And Charlie Chamberlain, Rodeo Records, with Marg Osburne. 
 They Never Grow Old, Point Records, P-318 MG-251-252, 1967.
 Favorite Sacred Songs. 1970. Rodeo RO6M-1267
 Beyond the Sunset. 196?. Point Records
 They Never Grow Old. 1973. MCA Coral
 He: Songs Of Reverence: Volume 2. 196?. Apex
 Best of Marg and Charlie. 1973. MCA Coral, CBT 35006

Awards 

 Inducted into the Canadian Country Music Hall of Fame in 1989.
 Recipient (posthumously) of the ECMA Stompin' Tom Connors Award.

References

External links
Charlie Chamberlain at CCMA Hall of Fame
 Island Lives - Charlie Chamberlain on PEI 
http://www.islandlives.ca/fedora/repository/ilives%3A85365-p_101/OCR/OR
https://www.discogs.com/artist/2390349-Charlie-Chamberlain

1911 births
1972 deaths
Musicians from Bathurst, New Brunswick
Canadian country singers
20th-century Canadian male singers